The Beefsteak Raid was a Confederate cavalry raid that took place in September 1864 as part of the Siege of Petersburg during the American Civil War. Confederate Maj. Gen. Wade Hampton led a force of 3,000 troopers of the Confederate States Army on what was to become a  ride to acquire cattle that were intended for consumption by the Union Army, which was laying a combined siege to the cities of Richmond and Petersburg, Virginia.

Background
Always lacking in supplies, the Confederate forces that were defending the capital of Richmond were beginning to run out of food. A report by General Robert E. Lee on August 22, 1864, stated that corn to feed the Southern soldiers was exhausted. A scout, Sergeant George D. Shadburne, informed General Hampton on September 5 that there were 3,000 lightly defended cattle behind Union lines, at Edmund Ruffin's plantation on Coggin's Point,   down the James River from Lt. Gen. Ulysses S. Grant's headquarters.  Believing the cattle were defended by only 120 Union soldiers and 30 civilians (the actual force was larger, but still less than 500), Hampton arranged for 3,000 Confederate troops to follow him. These men included "several certified Texas cattle thieves".

Raid
On September 14, 1864, Hampton led his men to the south of Petersburg and the Union trenches, in order to eventually turn north behind Union lines. He chose to cross where the Cook's Bridge over the Blackwater River once stood, knowing that an attack from there would be unexpected. He had some engineers reconstruct the bridge. At 5 a.m. on September 16, Hampton's force attacked with a three-prong strike, with the center directed toward the cattle. Hampton's force captured more than 2,000 cattle, along with 11 wagons and 304 prisoners, leading them back to the Confederate lines at 9 a.m. on September 17.

Aftermath
The total losses for the Confederates, who saw some opposition, were 10 killed, 47 wounded, and 4 missing. The official count of cattle successfully reaching the Confederates for food was 2,468.

Despite the raid's success, its strategic impact was not as great as the large number of cattle taken might seem to indicate.  For whereas the Union had the resources to replace its lost cattle, the Confederates lacked hay or grain to spare for feed.  They were therefore forced to slaughter the cattle almost as soon as they had secured them.  The ensuing "feast" on the Confederate side might be better described as a rush to consume the beef before it spoiled.  Salt for preserving meat was scarce in the Confederacy.

For days afterwards, the southerners would taunt the northern sentries, thanking them for all the food and inviting them over for dinner. There was so much beef available that Confederate sentries would sometimes offer it in unauthorized trades with Union sentries for certain luxury items of which the Federal soldiers had a plentiful supply, but the Confederates lacked. After the beef was eaten or spoiled, the Confederates reverted to their previous, dire food situation.

Abraham Lincoln called the raid "the slickest piece of cattle-stealing" he ever heard of. General Lee's adjutant, Lt. Col. Walter H. Taylor, said it made up for disruption of Confederate supply lines caused by the loss of the Weldon Railroad, a claim most historians consider to be overstated.

Legacy
Much of the action of the Beefsteak Raid took place in Prince George County. The Prince George County Historical Society commemorates the raid with a steak dinner each September.

A fictionalized depiction of the raid is featured in the 1966 film Alvarez Kelly.

References

Cattle
Petersburg Campaign
Battles of the Eastern Theater of the American Civil War
Confederate victories of the American Civil War
Prince George County in the American Civil War
Cavalry raids of the American Civil War
Conflicts in 1864
1864 in Virginia
Battles of the American Civil War in Virginia
Military operations of the American Civil War in Virginia
September 1864 events